James Lent (1782 – February 22, 1833) was an American politician who served two terms as a U.S. Representative from New York from 1829 to 1833.

Biography 
Born in Newtown, New York (now a part of the Borough of Queens), Lent engaged in mercantile pursuits in New York City. He served as judge of Queens County and served from February 5, 1823, to March 4, 1829.

Congress 
Lent was elected as a Jacksonian to the Twenty-first and Twenty-second Congresses and served from March 4, 1829, until his death in Washington, D.C., February 22, 1833.

He served as chairman of the Committee on Expenditures in the Department of State (Twenty-second Congress).

Death
He died on February 22, 1833, and was originally interred in the Congressional Cemetery. He was reinterred in the Presbyterian Cemetery, Newtown, Long Island, New York.

See also
List of United States Congress members who died in office (1790–1899)

Sources

1782 births
1833 deaths
Burials at the Congressional Cemetery
Jacksonian members of the United States House of Representatives from New York (state)
Democratic Party members of the United States House of Representatives from New York (state)
New York (state) state court judges
19th-century American politicians